Faal, an alternative spelling for Phall, is a British Asian curry.

Faal may also refer to:

 Faal (surname)
 Alldays Airport (ICAO: FAAL), an airport serving Alldays, Limpopo province, South Africa
 A Fellow of the Australian Academy of Law

See also
 
 Faala, Samoa